is a former Japanese football player.

Playing career
Koido was born in Gifu on April 9, 1978. After graduating from University of Tsukuba, he joined J2 League club Mito HollyHock in 2001. He debuted as defender against Kawasaki Frontale on May 3. He played 6 matches in a row from the debut. However he could not play at all in the match after that and retired end of 2001 season.

Club statistics

References

External links

1978 births
Living people
University of Tsukuba alumni
Association football people from Gifu Prefecture
Japanese footballers
J2 League players
Mito HollyHock players
Association football defenders